A Slice of the Top is an album by jazz saxophonist Hank Mobley recorded on March 18, 1966. The album was not released on the Blue Note label until 1979. It features performances by Mobley with a larger than usual ensemble of trumpeter Lee Morgan, euphonium player Kiane Zawadi, tuba player Howard Johnson, alto saxophonist James Spaulding, pianist McCoy Tyner, bassist Bob Cranshaw, and drummer Billy Higgins. The arrangements were written by Duke Pearson. On the original LP, Reggie Workman was mistakenly identified on the sleeve as the bassist.

Composition and Release 
Mobley composed the music for the album in 1964 while imprisoned for a narcotics offence. The sheet music was given to Duke Pearson to arrange while Mobley was incarcerated.

Mobley was bitter about Blue Note delaying the release of the album until over a decade after it was recorded. In an interview, Mobley complained:I have about five records on the shelf - Blue Note had half the black musicians around New York City, and now the records are just lying around. What they do is just hold it and wait for you to die.

Reception
The AllMusic review by Scott Yanow awarded the album 4½ stars, stating: "Mobley, who continued to evolve into a more advanced player throughout the 1960s, fits right in with such adventurous players as altoist James Spaulding, trumpeter Lee Morgan (with whom Mobley recorded frequently), pianist McCoy Tyner, bassist Reggie Workman and drummer Billy Higgins. The inclusion of Kiane Zawadi on euphonium and Howard Johnson on tuba adds a lot of color to this memorable outing."

Track listing 
All compositions by Hank Mobley except as noted
 "Hank's Other Bag" – 7:12
 "There's a Lull In My Life" (Mack Gordon, Harry Revel) – 5:25
 "Cute 'N Pretty" – 7:36
 "A Touch of the Blues" – 8:46
 "A Slice of the Top" - 9:40

Personnel: 

Hank Mobley - tenor saxophone
James Spaulding - alto saxophone
Lee Morgan - trumpet
Kiane Zawadi - euphonium
Howard Johnson - tuba
McCoy Tyner - piano
Bob Cranshaw - bass
Billy Higgins - drums

References 

1979 albums
Albums produced by Alfred Lion
Blue Note Records albums
Hank Mobley albums
Albums recorded at Van Gelder Studio